Stefano Ghirardelli (1633 – February, 1708) was a Roman Catholic prelate who served as Bishop of Alatri (1683–1708).

Biography
Stefano Ghirardelli was born in Rome, Italy in 1633. On 14 June 1683, he was appointed during the papacy of Pope Innocent XI as Bishop of Alatri. On 20 June 1683, he was consecrated bishop by Alessandro Crescenzi (cardinal), Cardinal-Priest of Santa Prisca, with Pier Antonio Capobianco, Bishop Emeritus of Lacedonia, and Francesco Maria Giannotti, Bishop of Segni, serving as co-consecrators. He served as Bishop of Alatri until his death in February 1708.

References

External links and additional sources
 (for Chronology of Bishops) 
 (for Chronology of Bishops)  

17th-century Italian Roman Catholic bishops
18th-century Italian Roman Catholic bishops
Bishops appointed by Pope Innocent XI
1633 births
1708 deaths